Network Browser was an application that shipped with Mac OS 9 to allow users to connect to other computers and printers on a network, and access FTP servers, intended to replace the Chooser that shipped with previous versions.

See also
 Safari — Apple's current web browser
 Mail — Apple's current eMail client
 Finder (10.2+) — Apple later integrated FTP functionality into the Finder
  Address Book  — Apple's system-level address book service
 Claris Emailer — Apple's eMail client

Classic Mac OS